Eric Jarosinski (born 1971) is an American Germanist, author, humorist, and public speaker. Jarosinski writes under the nom de plume NeinQuarterly on the social networking site Twitter, where he writes linguistic, political, and philosophical aphorisms, keeping to the 140-character limit. Jarosinski writes in German, Dutch and English. He began tweeting in 2012 and soon had a significant following (with 150,000 followers as of 2017). He then made the jump to print with a weekly column in the leading German weekly Die Zeit (2014–present) and the Dutch daily NRC Handelsblad (2015-2016) Jarosinski's first book Nein. A Manifesto was released in 2015 and has been published in English, German, Spanish, Italian, Dutch, and Danish.

Background 

Jarosinski grew up in Park Falls, Wisconsin. As a child he had some exposure to the German language (Wisconsin having a large number of German Americans), though he ascribes his interest in German culture and language more to his travels in Europe and later study of German and Journalism at the University of Wisconsin-Madison. During those years he studied abroad in Bonn and at the University of Utrecht in the Netherlands, where he learned Dutch, and went on to spend a year studying in Frankfurt am Main as a Fulbright scholar.

After study and dissertation research in Berlin as a German Chancellor Fellow (Alexander von Humboldt Foundation), Jarosinski completed his Ph.D. at the University of Wisconsin–Madison in 2005 with a dissertation on "transparency" as a political aesthetic and highly fraught ideological program.

Jarosinski has taught at the University of Rochester (2004-2005), Rutgers University (2005-2007), and the University of Pennsylvania (2007-2014), where his research and teaching focused on the Frankfurt School theorists Theodor Adorno, Walter Benjamin and Siegfried Kracauer as well the work of Marx, Nietzsche and Kafka.

References

Sources

External links
Who is the Man Behind Nein Quarterly? A Conversation with Paul Holdengräber in LitHub, March 23, 2016

1971 births
Living people
People from Park Falls, Wisconsin
University of Wisconsin–Madison alumni
Germanists